Life or Death is American singer-songwriter Lili Añel's fourth release and first international album on the German-based record label, ESC Records.

Track listing
 Thin Line – 4:03
 Nothing In Common – 3:27
 If – 5:27
 Lay Down Play Dead – 4:39
 2 Much Better – 4:46
 Life Or Death – 4:24
 Dream Again – 5:53
 The Way Out – 3:50
 Won’t You Stay – 4:19
 Down To Zero – 3:57
 No Matter What Love – 4:36
 Between Me – 4:58
 Over You – 3:47
 Land On My Feet – 3:48
 I’m Sorry – 3:30

All compositions by Lili Añel except "Down to Zero" by Joan Armatrading.

Personnel
Musicians
Lili Añel — Vocals, guitars
Drew Zingg — electric & acoustic guitars
Johnny Gale — electric guitars
Seth Glassman — bass
Andy Burton — Hammond B3, piano
Frank Vilardi — drums
Cooke Harvey — electric & upright bass, keyboards
and string arrangements and textures on "Land On My Feet"
Dave Bozenhard — guitars
John DiGiovanni – drums, percussion
J.B. Moore — piano on "If"
John Ward — percussion on "If"

Producers
Tracks 1, 2, 3, 4, 5, 8, 9, 11 produced by J.B. Moore
Tracks 6, 7, 10, 12, 13, 14, 15 produced by Lili Anel & Cook Harvey

Engineers
Rick Kerr – tracks1, 2, 3, 4, 5, 8, 9
Julio Peña – track 11
Cooke Harvey - Tracks 6, 7, 10, 12, 13, 14, 15
Tracks 1, 2, 3, 4, 5, 8, 9, 11 mastered by Danny Wyatt
Tracks 6, 7, 10, 12, 13, 14, 15 mastered by Marc Moss

References

2008 albums
Lili Añel albums